Frantz Gumbs (born 21 January 1954) is a French Saint Martinois politician from La République En Marche! and Saint-Martinois Rally. He is Member of Parliament for Saint-Barthélemy and Saint-Martin's 1st constituency after defeating Republicans MP Claire Guion-Firmin in the 2022 French legislative election.

References

See also 

 List of deputies of the 16th National Assembly of France

Living people
1954 births
Members of Parliament for Saint Barthélemy and Saint Martin
Deputies of the 16th National Assembly of the French Fifth Republic
Presidents of the Territorial Council of Saint Martin
21st-century French politicians

La République En Marche! politicians